John Hanson "Hanse" McNeill (June 12, 1815 – November 10, 1864) was a Confederate soldier who served as a captain in the Confederate Army during the American Civil War. He led McNeill's Rangers, an independent irregular Confederate military company commissioned under the Partisan Ranger Act.

Early and family life
McNeill was born near Moorefield, Virginia (now West Virginia). He was the son of Strother and Amy Pugh McNeill. In 1848, he moved himself, his wife, three sons and one daughter to Boone County, Missouri, where he operated a cattle business.

Civil War
In 1861, he formed and was named commander of a company in the Missouri State Guard, seeing action in Boonville, Carthage, Wilson's Creek, and Lexington. Although captured and imprisoned in St. Louis, he escaped on June 15, 1862, and made his way back to Virginia.

In Richmond, he obtained permission to form an independent unit in the western counties of West Virginia and Virginia in order to disrupt Union activities in the area. This was granted, and on September 5, 1862, McNeill became captain of Company E of the 18th Virginia Cavalry, more commonly known as McNeill's Rangers. Along with raids on railroads and wagon trains, he first proposed the operation that became the Jones-Imboden Raid. Opponents called him a Bushwhacker.

Death and legacy
On October 3, 1864, McNeill led his unit in a successful predawn attack on a detachment of the 8th Ohio Cavalry Regiment guarding a bridge at Meems Bottom near Mount Jackson, Virginia. Although his forces secured supplies, McNeill was severely wounded. Taken first to the Reverend Anders Rude home nearby, he died at Hill's Hotel in Harrisonburg, Virginia (where the Massanutten Regional Library now stands) on November 10, 1864.

Initially buried in Harrisonburg with full Military and Masonic honors, his Rangers returned his body to Hardy County, West Virginia, for reinterment. He is buried in Olivet Cemetery in Moorefield, West Virginia, next to the Monument to Confederate Dead, surrounded by the graves of other Confederate soldiers.

Command of the Rangers passed to his son Jesse Cunningham McNeill after his father's death.

References

Further reading
Simeon Miller Bright. The McNeill Rangers: A Study in Confederate Guerrilla Warfare, West Virginia History, Volume 12, Number 4 (July 1951), pp. 338–387
Jefferson Waite Duffey. McNeill's last charge; an account of a daring Confederate in the Civil War. Winchester, Va.: Geo. F. Norton Pub. Co., 1912 
Roger U. Delauter. McNeill's Rangers (Virginia Regimental Histories Series), H. E. Howard, 2nd edition (December 1986), 
Neil Hunter Raiford. The 4th North Carolina Cavalry in the Civil War. McFarland & Company, 2003, page 5.

External links

Captain John Hanson McNeill, Project for the Sesquicentennial of the Civil War in Historic Hampshire County
McNeill's Rangers In Moorefield – The Historic Art of John Paul Strain
McNeill’s Confederate Rangers, Award-winning author Steve French discusses a guerilla band of Confederates known as McNeill's Rangers
 Apple Alley Players auditioning for revival of 'McNeill's Rangers'

1815 births
1864 deaths
People of Virginia in the American Civil War
People from Moorefield, West Virginia
Military personnel from West Virginia
Confederate States Army officers
Irregular forces of the American Civil War
Civil War near Cumberland, Maryland
Raids of the American Civil War
Hampshire County, West Virginia, in the American Civil War
Hardy County, West Virginia, in the American Civil War
Confederate States of America military personnel killed in the American Civil War